Hartlip is a village and civil parish in the borough of Swale, in the county of Kent, England.

The population estimate was 680 in 1991, and in 2001 there were 566 registered voters. At the 2011 Census the population was 746. The village covers 1420 acres (5.7 km²) and is in an agricultural region of high quality fruit farming, hops and grain.

Location
Hartlip is situated between the M2 motorway (Strood to Canterbury) and the A2 main road from London to Canterbury. It is at Hartlip Hill, between Rainham and Newington on Watling Street, the old Roman road. It stands about 50 m above sea level.

Ordnance Survey grid reference: TQ 838 642 GB.

Name
The name Hartlip derives from the Old English hliep, which meant a gate or fence. In combination with heorot (hart or stag), the name therefore means a "gate over which harts leap". The first recorded version of the name was Heordlyp in the 11th century.

Places of interest
Queendown Warren is a nature reserve in the village. The reserve covers almost 80 hectares (198 acres) and comprises several distinct sections. The original reserve was a rabbit warren in mediaeval times and forms the reserve's core. It has been open downland for many hundreds of years and has an internationally important community of grassland orchids.

Buildings
There are the remains of an extensive Roman villa discovered in Danes Field.

Hartlip parish church, named St. Michael and All Angels, is built of flint and has a peal of 6 bells. The oldest bell, number 5, was cast by Robert Burford between 1392 and circa 1418. The church registers go back to 1538. The village also has a Cardiphonia United Methodist church, built in 1821.

Hartlip Endowed Church of England Primary School is one of the oldest establishments for primary education in North East Kent. It was endowed in 1678 by Mary Gibbon and rebuilt in 1855. It is situated next to the parish church, with an adjoining gateway.

The only public house is the Rose and Crown. It is situated at the lower end of Hollow Lane, whose name is reputed to come from a secret tunnel leading to it from the church.

The countryside around Hartlip held in the past, three manor houses: Yaugher, Hartlip & Grayney. From these manors remain two manor houses. Yaugher had the manor house Queendown Warren. This was built in 1560 using oak bought from Henry VIII. In 1841 the owner chose to move the house to a new site. The local wagoner and his men took down the house and moved it a few miles to its present location on Queendown Warren alongside the nature reserve. Hartlip Place was built in 1809 replacing a former one built 500 years earlier, which had fallen into disrepair.

References

External links

 http://freepages.genealogy.rootsweb.com/~mrawson/dir08hart.html

Villages in Kent
Civil parishes in Kent